Nipponaphera agastor is a species of sea snail, a marine gastropod mollusk in the family Cancellariidae, the nutmeg snails.

Description
The length of the shell attains 19.3 mm.

Distribution
This marine species occurs off Guadalcanal, Solomon Islands.

References

 Bouchet P. & Petit R.E. (2008). New species and new records of southwest Pacific Cancellariidae. The Nautilus 122(1): 1-18.

agastor
Gastropods described in 2008